The 1959 Arkansas Razorbacks football team represented the University of Arkansas in the Southwest Conference (SWC) during the 1959 NCAA University Division football season. In their second year under head coach Frank Broyles, the Razorbacks compiled a 9–2 record (5–1 against SWC opponents), finished in a tie with Texas for the SWC championship, and outscored all opponents by a combined total of 163 to 101.  The Razorbacks' only losses came against Texas by a 13–12 score and to Mississippi by a 28–0 score. The team was ranked #9 in both the final AP Poll and the final UPI Coaches Poll and went on to defeat Georgia Tech in the 1960 Gator Bowl by a 14–7 score. Halfback Jim Mooty was selected by the Associated Press as a first-team player on the 1959 All-America Team.

Schedule

References

Arkansas Razorbacks
Arkansas Razorbacks football seasons
Southwest Conference football champion seasons
Gator Bowl champion seasons
Arkansas Razorbacks football